Alan Parkhurst Dodd (8 January 1896 - 3 July 1981) was an entomologist in Australia. He introduced the Cactoblastis moth as a biological control for prickly pear. His father was the entomologist Frederick Parkhurst Dodd.

He was featured in the Magnificent Makers exhibition at the State Library of Queensland in 2018.

References 

 Australian Dictionary of Biography

Australian entomologists
1896 births
1981 deaths
20th-century Australian zoologists